The country of Norway is historically divided into a number of districts. Many districts have deep historical roots, and only partially coincide with today's administrative units of counties and municipalities. The districts are defined by geographical features, often valleys, mountain ranges, fjords, plains, or coastlines, or combinations of the above. Many such regions were petty kingdoms up to the early Viking Age.

Regional identity

A high percentage of Norwegians identify themselves more by the district they live in or come from, than the formal administrative unit(s) whose jurisdiction they fall under. A significant reason for this is that the districts, through their strong geographical limits, have historically delineated the region(s) within which one could travel without too much trouble or expenditure of time and money (on foot or skis, by horse/ox-drawn cart or sleigh or dog sled, or by one's own small rowing or sail boat). Thus, dialects and regional commonality in folk culture tended to correspond to those same geographical units, despite any division into administrative districts by authorities.

In modern times the whole country has become more closely connected, based on the following:
Communication technologies such as telegraph, newspapers, telephone, radio and TV, in particular Televerket and NRK.
The construction of mountain crossings, tunnels through mountains, bridges, undersea tunnels; many of these projects, particularly the larger bridges and the undersea tunnels, were undertaken as late as the 1970s forward.
Establishing a coastal express route of combined passenger and cargo ships, like the Hurtigruten, sailing regularly from Bergen to Kirkenes and back again, and stopping by at a host of cities and towns along the western and northern coast.
The construction of railroads between distant parts of the country.
The opening of dozens of new airports all over the country through the 1960s and 1970s.
The release of private cars from government rationing and import restrictions from the 1950s onwards.

A concrete display of the Norwegian habit of identifying themselves by district can be seen in the many regional costumes, called bunad, strictly connected to distinct districts across the country. Commonly, even city dwellers proudly mark their rural origins by wearing such a costume, from their ancestral landscape, at weddings, visits with members of the royal family, Constitution Day (May 17), and other ceremonial occasions.

List of traditional districts
The following list is non-exhaustive and partially overlapping.

The first name is the name in Bokmål, the second Nynorsk.

/  (North Norway)
 Helgeland
 Lofoten
 Ofoten
 Salten
 Vesterålen

See also Finnmark, Hålogaland and Troms.

(Southern Norway)
 Agder
 Kristiansandregionen
 Lister
 Setesdal

Fosen
 Gauldalen
 Innherad
 Namdalen
 Orkdalen
 Stjørdalen

(Western Norway)
 Dalane
 Hardanger
 Haugalandet
 Jæren
 Midhordland
 Nordfjord
 Nordhordland
 Nordmøre
 Romsdal
 Ryfylke
 Sogn
 Sunnfjord
 Sunnhordland
 Sunnmøre
 Voss

/  (Eastern Norway)
 Follo
 Glåmdalen
 Grenland
 Gudbrandsdalen
 Hadeland
 Hallingdal
 Hedmarken
 Land
 Numedal
 Ringerike
 Romerike
 Toten
 Upper Telemark
 Valdres
 Vestfold
 Østerdalen
 Østfold

See also Viken and Vingulmark.

See also
 Regions of Norway
 Counties of Norway
 Metropolitan regions of Norway
Subdivisions of Norden
Traditional districts of Denmark

External links
Districts of Norway in 1950 (RTF) – From the documentation project at the University of Oslo
Regionalization and devolution: Proposed new regions of Norway (powerpoint slide show)
Map showing regions of Medieval Norway

 
Vernacular geography